The archbishop of Canterbury is the senior bishop and a principal leader of the Church of England, the ceremonial head of the worldwide Anglican Communion and the bishop of the Diocese of Canterbury. The current archbishop is Justin Welby, who was enthroned at Canterbury Cathedral on 21 March 2013. Welby is the 105th in a line which goes back more than 1400 years to Augustine of Canterbury, the "Apostle to the English", sent from Rome in the year 597. Welby succeeded Rowan Williams.

From the time of Augustine until the 16th century, the archbishops of Canterbury were in full communion with the See of Rome and usually received the pallium from the pope. During the English Reformation, the Church of England broke away from the authority of the pope. Thomas Cranmer became the first holder of the office following the English Reformation in 1533, while Reginald Pole was the last Roman Catholic in the position, serving from 1556 to 1558 during the Counter-Reformation. In the Middle Ages there was considerable variation in the methods of nomination of the archbishop of Canterbury and other bishops. At various times the choice was made by the monks of the cathedral priory (before the Dissolution of the Monasteries under Henry VIII), the pope, or the king of England. Since the English Reformation, the Church of England has been more explicitly a state church and the choice is legally that of the Crown; today it is made by the reigning monarch on the advice of the prime minister, who in turn receives a shortlist of two names from an ad hoc committee called the Crown Nominations Commission.

Present roles and status 
Today the archbishop fills four main roles:

 He is the bishop of the Diocese of Canterbury, which covers the eastern parts of the County of Kent. Founded in 597, it is the oldest see in the English church.
 He is the metropolitan archbishop of the Province of Canterbury, which covers the southern two-thirds of England.
 He is the senior primate and chief religious figure of the Church of England (the British sovereign is the supreme governor of the church). Along with his colleague the archbishop of York he chairs the General Synod and sits on or chairs many of the church's important boards and committees; power in the church is not highly centralised, however, so the two archbishops can often lead only through persuasion. The archbishop of Canterbury plays a central part in national ceremonies such as coronations; due to his high public profile, his opinions are often in demand by the news media.
 As spiritual leader of the Anglican Communion, the archbishop, although without legal authority outside England, is recognised by convention as primus inter pares ("first among equals") of all Anglican primates worldwide. Since 1867 he has convened more or less decennial meetings of worldwide Anglican bishops, the Lambeth Conferences.

In the last two of these functions, he has an important ecumenical and interfaith role, speaking on behalf of Anglicans in England and worldwide.

The archbishop's main residence is Lambeth Palace in the London Borough of Lambeth. He also has lodgings in the Old Palace, Canterbury, located beside Canterbury Cathedral, where the Chair of St Augustine sits.

As holder of one of the "five great sees" (the others being York, London, Durham and Winchester), the archbishop of Canterbury is ex officio one of the Lords Spiritual of the House of Lords. He is one of the highest-ranking men in England and the highest ranking non-royal in the United Kingdom's order of precedence.

Since Henry VIII broke with Rome, the archbishops of Canterbury have been selected by the English (British since the Act of Union in 1707) monarch. Since the 20th century, the appointment of archbishops of Canterbury conventionally alternates between Anglo-Catholics and Evangelicals.

The current archbishop, Justin Welby, the 105th archbishop of Canterbury, was enthroned at Canterbury Cathedral on 4 February 2013. As archbishop he signs himself as + Justin Cantuar. His predecessor, Rowan Williams, 104th archbishop of Canterbury, was enthroned at Canterbury Cathedral on 27 February 2003. Immediately prior to his appointment to Canterbury, Williams was the bishop of Monmouth and archbishop of Wales. On 18 March 2012, Williams announced he would be stepping down as archbishop of Canterbury at the end of 2012 to become master of Magdalene College, Cambridge.

Additional roles 
In addition to his office, the archbishop holds a number of other positions; for example, he is joint president of the Council of Christians and Jews in the United Kingdom. Some positions he formally holds ex officio and others virtually so (the incumbent of the day, although appointed personally, is appointed because of his office). Amongst these are:
 Chancellor of Canterbury Christ Church University
 Visitor for the following academic institutions:
 All Souls College, Oxford
 Selwyn College, Cambridge
 Merton College, Oxford
 Keble College, Oxford
 Ridley Hall, Cambridge
 The University of Kent (main campus located in Canterbury)
 King's College London
 University of King's College
 Sutton Valence School
 Benenden School
 Cranbrook School
 Haileybury and Imperial Service College
 Harrow School
 King's College School, Wimbledon
 The King's School, Canterbury
 St John's School, Leatherhead
 Marlborough College
 Dauntsey's School
 Wycliffe Hall, Oxford (also Patron)
 Governor of Charterhouse School
 Governor of Wellington College
 Visitor, The Dulwich Charities
 Visitor, Whitgift Foundation
 Visitor, Hospital of the Blessed Trinity, Guildford (Abbot's Fund)
 Trustee, Bromley College
 Trustee, Allchurches Trust
 President, Corporation of Church House, Westminster
 Director, Canterbury Diocesan Board of Finance
 Patron, St Edmund's School Canterbury
 Patron, The Worshipful Company of Parish Clerks
 Patron, Prisoners Abroad
 Patron, The Kent Savers Credit Union
 Patron, Sanctuary Mental Health Ministries

Ecumenical and interfaith 
The archbishop is also a president of Churches Together in England (an ecumenical organisation). Geoffrey Fisher, 99th archbishop of Canterbury, was the first since 1397 to visit Rome, where he held private talks with Pope John XXIII in 1960. In 2005, Rowan Williams became the first archbishop of Canterbury to attend a papal funeral since the Reformation. He also attended the inauguration of Pope Benedict XVI. The 101st archbishop, Donald Coggan, was the first to attend a papal inauguration, that of Pope John Paul II in 1978.

Since 2002, the archbishop has co-sponsored the Alexandria Middle East Peace process with the Grand Mufti of Egypt. In July 2008, the archbishop attended a conference of Christians, Jews and Muslims convened by the king of Saudi Arabia at which the notion of the "clash of civilizations" was rejected. Delegates agreed "on international guidelines for dialogue among the followers of religions and cultures." Delegates said that "the deepening of moral values and ethical principles, which are common denominators among such followers, would help strengthen stability and achieve prosperity for all humans."

Origins 

It has been suggested that the Roman province of Britannia had four archbishops, seated at Londinium (London), Eboracum (York), Lindum Colonia (Lincoln) and Corinium Dobunnorum (Cirencester). However, in the 5th and 6th centuries Britannia began to be overrun by pagan, Germanic peoples who came to be known collectively as the Anglo-Saxons. Of the kingdoms they created, Kent arguably had the closest links with European politics, trade and culture, because it was conveniently situated for communication with continental Europe. In the late 6th century, King Æthelberht of Kent married a Christian Frankish princess named Bertha, possibly before becoming king, and certainly a number of years before the arrival of the first Christian mission to England. He permitted the preaching of Christianity.

The first archbishop of Canterbury was Saint Augustine of Canterbury (not to be confused with Saint Augustine of Hippo), who arrived in Kent in 597 AD, having been sent by Pope Gregory I on a mission to the English. He was accepted by King Æthelbert, on his conversion to Christianity, about the year 598. It seems that Pope Gregory, ignorant of recent developments in the former Roman province, including the spread of the Pelagian heresy, had intended the new archiepiscopal sees for England to be established in London and York. In the event, Canterbury was chosen instead of London, owing to political circumstances. Since then the archbishops of Canterbury have been referred to as occupying the Chair of St. Augustine.
Univ
A gospel book believed to be directly associated with St Augustine's mission survives in the Parker Library, Corpus Christi College, University of Cambridge, England. Catalogued as Cambridge Manuscript 286, it has been positively dated to 6th-century Italy and this bound book, the St Augustine Gospels, is still used during the swearing-in ceremony of new archbishops of Canterbury.

Before the break with papal authority in the 16th century, the Church of England was an integral part of the Western European church. Since the break the Church of England, an established national church, still considers itself part of the broader Western Catholic tradition (although this is not accepted by the Roman Catholic Church which regards Anglicanism as schismatic and does not accept Anglican holy orders as valid) as well as being the "mother church" of the worldwide Anglican Communion.

The Report of the Commissioners appointed by his Majesty to inquire into the Ecclesiastical Revenues of England and Wales (1835) noted the net annual revenue for the Canterbury see was £19,182.

Province and Diocese of Canterbury 

The archbishop of Canterbury exercises metropolitical (or supervisory) jurisdiction over the Province of Canterbury, which encompasses thirty of the forty-two dioceses of the Church of England, with the rest falling within the Province of York. The four Welsh dioceses were also under the Province of Canterbury until 1920 when they were transferred from the established church of England to the disestablished Church in Wales.

The archbishop of Canterbury has a ceremonial provincial curia, or court, consisting of some of the senior bishops of his province. The bishop of London—the most senior cleric of the church with the exception of the two archbishops—serves as Canterbury's provincial dean, the bishop of Winchester as chancellor, the bishop of Lincoln as vice-chancellor, the bishop of Salisbury as precentor, the bishop of Worcester as chaplain and the bishop of Rochester as cross-bearer.

Along with primacy over the archbishop of York, the archbishop of Canterbury also has a precedence of honour over the other bishops of the Anglican Communion. He is recognised as primus inter pares, or first amongst equals. He does not, however, exercise any direct authority in the provinces outside England, except in certain minor roles dictated by Canon in those provinces (for example, he is the judge in the event of an ecclesiastical prosecution against the archbishop of Wales). He does hold metropolitical authority over several extra-provincial Anglican churches, and he serves as ex officio bishop of the Falkland Islands.

At present the archbishop has four suffragan bishops:

 The bishop of Dover is given the additional title of "bishop in Canterbury" and empowered to act almost as if the bishop of Dover were the diocesan bishop of the Diocese of Canterbury, since the archbishop is so frequently away fulfilling national and international duties.
 Two further suffragans, the bishop of Ebbsfleet and the bishop of Richborough, are provincial episcopal visitors for the whole Province of Canterbury, licensed by the archbishop as "flying bishops" to provide oversight throughout the province to parishes who for conscience’ sake cannot accept that women can be ordained in the Sacrament of Ordination in the Church of England.
 The bishop of Maidstone provides alternative episcopal oversight for the Province of Canterbury for particular members who take a conservative evangelical view of male headship. On 23 September 2015, Rod Thomas was consecrated bishop of Maidstone. Previously the bishop of Maidstone was an actual suffragan bishop working in the diocese, until it was decided at the diocesan synod of November 2010 that a new bishop would not be appointed.

Styles and privileges 

The archbishop of Canterbury and the archbishop of York are both styled as "The Most Reverend"; retired archbishops are styled as "The Right Reverend". Archbishops are, by convention, appointed to the Privy Council and may, therefore, also use the style of "The Right Honourable" for life (unless they are later removed from the council). In formal documents, the archbishop of Canterbury is referred to as "The Most Reverend Forenames, by Divine Providence Lord Archbishop of Canterbury, Primate of All England and Metropolitan". In debates in the House of Lords, the archbishop is referred to as "The Most Reverend Primate, the Archbishop of Canterbury". "The Right Honourable" is not used in either instance. He may also be formally addressed as "Your Grace"—or, more often these days, simply as "Archbishop", or "Father".

The surname of the archbishop of Canterbury is not always used in formal documents; often only the first name and see are mentioned. The archbishop is legally entitled to sign his name as "Cantuar" (from the Latin for Canterbury). The right to use a title as a legal signature is only permitted to bishops, peers of the Realm and peers by courtesy. The current archbishop of Canterbury usually signs as "+Justin Cantuar:".

In the English and Welsh order of precedence, the archbishop of Canterbury is ranked above all individuals in the realm, with the exception of the sovereign and members of the royal family. Immediately below him is the lord chancellor and then the archbishop of York.

Lambeth degrees 
The archbishop of Canterbury awards academic degrees, commonly called "Lambeth degrees".

Residences 

The archbishop of Canterbury's official residence in London is Lambeth Palace.
He also has a residence, named The Old Palace, next to Canterbury Cathedral on the site of the medieval Archbishop's Palace.
The archbishops had palaces on the periphery of London and on the route between London and Canterbury.

Former palaces of the archbishops include

 Croydon Palace: the summer residence of the archbishops from the 15th to the 18th centuries.
 Addington Palace: purchased as a replacement for Croydon Palace in 1807; sold in 1897.
 Archbishop's Palace, Maidstone: constructed in the 1390s, the palace was seized by the Crown at the time of the Reformation.
 Otford Palace: a medieval palace, rebuilt by Archbishop Warham  and forfeited to the Crown by Thomas Cranmer in 1537.
 Archbishop's Palace, Charing: a palace existed from at least the 13th century; seized by the Crown after the Dissolution.
 Knole House: built by Archbishop Bourchier in the second half of the 15th century, it was forfeited to the Crown by Archbishop Cranmer in 1538.

List of recent archbishops 

Since 1900, the following have served as archbishop of Canterbury:

 1896–1902: Frederick Temple
 1903–1928: Randall Davidson
 1928–1942: Cosmo Gordon Lang
 1942–1944: William Temple
 1945–1961: Geoffrey Fisher
 1961–1974: Michael Ramsey
 1974–1980: Donald Coggan
 1980–1991: Robert Runcie
 1991–2002: George Carey
 2002–2012: Rowan Williams
 2013–present: Justin Welby

Archbishops who became peers 
From 1660 to 1902, all the archbishops of Canterbury died in office. In 1928, two years before his death, Randall Davidson became the first  voluntarily to resign his office. All his successors except William Temple (who died in office in 1944) have also resigned their office before death.

All those who retired have been given peerages: initially hereditary baronies (although both recipients of such titles died without male heirs and so their titles became extinct on their deaths), and life peerages after the enactment of the Life Peerages Act 1958. Such titles have allowed retired archbishops to retain the seats in the House of Lords which they held ex officio before their retirement.

See also 
 Accord of Winchester
 Ecumenical Patriarch of Constantinople
 Religion in the United Kingdom

References

External links 

 

 The Archbishopric of Canterbury, from Its Foundation to the Norman Conquest, by John William Lamb", Published 1971, Faith Press, from Google Book Search

 
597 establishments
6th-century establishments in England
Anglican episcopal offices
Christianity in Kent
Church of England
Culture in Canterbury
Ecclesiastical titles
People associated with Canterbury Christ Church University
People associated with King's College London
People associated with the Royal National College for the Blind
People associated with the University of Kent
Canterbury
Religious leadership roles
Anglican Communion